The Beijing International Studies University (BISU) is a public research university based in the city of Beijing, China. Founded in 1964, it was part of the national initiative to promote tertiary foreign language education.  The institute grew out of a subsidiary of Xinhua News Agency and has developed into one of the most notable universities of foreign languages and cultural studies in China.  Today, the university pioneers in the fields of international trade, tourism studies and hospitality management.

It maintains links with national institutions including the Chinese Academy of Social Sciences and the National Tourism Administration. In addition, it holds formal collaborative agreements with more than 140 universities and academic institutions of about 40 countries spanning the continents, providing a wide range of study opportunities for inbound and outbound students alike.  According to the China Education and Research Network, the university is ranked fourth for the most satisfactory international admissions and services among Chinese universities.

BISU sits primarily in the central east of Chaoyang District, home to the city's CBD and the majority of foreign embassies. It is broadly organized into four academic divisions—Arts, Management, Economics and Political Sciences—within which there are 19 main departments and institutes, facilitated with numerous research centers, laboratories, interdisciplinary units and supporting services.

History
The history of Beijing International Studies University dates back to the 1950s, when People's Republic of China started to gain international recognition and the need emerged for proficient foreign language speakers.  In the early 1960s, after completing the 14-country state visit,  the then-Premier Zhou Enlai initiated the Seven-Year Plan for Foreign Language Education and proposed to establish the Beijing Second Foreign Languages Institute, now known as the Beijing International Studies University. The whole founding process was under the supervision of Zhou.

Origins

It was proposed by the then Premier Zhou Enlai to the State Council and the establishment of Beijing International Studies University was given the highest priority.
A report for the establishment of BISU was subsequently presented and approved at the State Council in March and later in August, the land where the university has maintained the presence of its main site was granted.
The first 646 students enrolled in September and the Establishment Ceremony was held on 24 October 1964. The university anniversary has been celebrated on that day ever since.

Development
The original curriculum framework of the university was built upon its core units in foreign languages, in addition to Chinese literature, arts and philosophy, international/domestic relations, political economy and physical education.
It offered degree programs for 14 foreign languages, including English, French, Spanish, Arabic, German, Japanese, Albanian, Romanian, Hungarian, Polish, Czech, Bulgarian, Serbian and Vietnamese.
Affiliated with the Commission for Cultural Relations of Foreign Countries—the predecessor of today's Culture Ministry—the university underwent rapid growth until 1966, when the Cultural Revolution started.
The university then changed administration several times over this period, successively administered by the Foreign Ministry (1968), the Beijing Government (1971), the Ministry of Education (1978) and the National Tourism Administration (1983).

In 1981, the report jointly submitted by the Ministry of Foreign Economic Relations and Trade and the university was approved at the Education Ministry; the Department of Foreign Affairs and Trade was established at BISU.
Concurrently, in the same year, the National Tourism Administration set up the major of tourism management in BISU, making it the earliest shaper of Chinese tourism education.
During the 1980s and 1990s, Beijing International Studies University, also known as the China Tourism Institute, prevailed in both teaching and research and was recognized as one of the foremost tertiary institutions for tourism studies.

2003—present

Until 2003, BISU was known in English as Beijing Second Foreign Language University;
the name changed to reflect the increasing diversity of programs offered by the university.
Its multi-disciplinary academic structure has been established since the 1990s and 2000s, best known for its business administration programs and foreign languages programs.
The university now offers language courses in English, Japanese, German, Russian, French, Italian, Spanish, Portuguese, Arabic, Korean
and Chinese as a foreign language for international students.
It is one of the first authorized HSK test centers based in Beijing, and has been recognized as one of Beijing's best universities for Chinese study.

In 2013, the university engaged in a major academic restructuring within its Business and Economics disciplines. In July, the former School of Tourism Management was dissolved, with Departments of Tourism Management and Hotel Management promoted to independent Schools, Departments of Marketing and Financial Management combined to form the School of International Business, and the Department of Event Management merged into the School of Economics and Trade.
The move was part of the Twelfth Five-Year Plan of the university, intending to endorse greater academic autonomy, take advantage of its heritage in tourism-related subjects and thus to effectively position itself in respond to the changes in the marketplace.

Timeline

1964–1966: Humble beginnings

1966–1976: Dark times

1977–1990: Post-Revolution recovery

1991–2000: Strategic redirection

2001–2010: New millennium

What's new

Campus 

BISU's main site is located in Chaoyang District, comprising three continuous campuses within walking distance of each other. It houses the main teaching facilities and student amenities, and benefits from excellent public transport links with access to metro subway line 6 and 8T.
The university also maintains facilities in other parts of the city. It owns an independently run Hospitality Institute in Daxing and has two branch colleges, one at the boundary between Fengtai and Haidian Districts, and one on the outskirts between the inner city and the County of Miyun.
In addition, a new site is projected to be built in Tongzhou from 2013.

Main Campus 

BISU's central campus occupies a 55.2-acre (223,334 m3) site in the vicinity of the Guomao neighbourhood, about 5 miles (8.8 km) east of the Central CBD. It neighbours the Communication University of China from the West Gate and has two main entrances on Jianguo Road (South Entrance) and Chaoyang Road (North Entrance), both with bus stops located within walking distance.

The campus is featured by a mixture of contemporary and antique architecture which is naturally integrated into the landscape.
While situated in the urban area, it is honored Garden Campus and has maintained this title since 1994.
In 1997, it was named the city's Model Campus.

The central campus boasts five major teaching buildings and four auditoriums,
six student halls of residence,
a comprehensive learning hub and the university library.
Full meals and light fare are available at two dining halls
and five specialty restaurants,
in addition to three corner stores offering snacks and drinks.
Vending machines are on the ground floor of the International Lodge.
In addition, it contains most of the sports facilities, including an outdoor stadium with two volleyball courts and six basketball courts, an indoor gymnasium, four tennis courts and an aquatic center.
Other amenities include
a supermarket,
two copy shops,
a book store
and a post office.
A pharmacy and an ICBC bank branch are located at the North Entrance, opposite to the Tian-Ke-Long shopping mall on the other side of the road.
The university press Tourism Education Press headquarter office is also located nearby.

The northern campus houses the School of Continuing Education and the Study Abroad Resource Center.
The Yi-Shui-Fang-Yuan campus in the south is the new residential area developed in 2011. Separated by the Jingtong Expressway from the central campus, it is centered on a peaceful site along the Tonghui River and provides housing facilities for most of the undergraduate and postgraduate students.

Tongzhou Campus

In 2013, a branch campus is expected to be built in Tongzhou District, the new City Sub-Center of Beijing.
The university president, Zhou Lie, disclosed in January that the new site would be located in Lucheng,
neighbouring the east campus of Renmin University and Peking Union Medical College,
with only a 20-minute drive to the central campus.

As of March 2013, the university has held conferences and seminars on feasibility analysis of the project, with regard to the 2013—2020 Outline of National Tourism and Leisure released by the State Council in February.

Academics

Structure

A Discipline in the Beijing International Studies University is a broad administrative concept for categorising related academic units.
The disciplinary divisions usually differentiate the degrees awarded.
Currently, the academic system of Beijing International Studies University is made up of four disciplines: Arts (languages, literature, cultural studies and philosophy), Business Administration, Economics Sciences and Law and Political Sciences.

Teaching and research at BISU is organized by departments, schools and institutes.
Schools may establish subsidiary departments and other subordinate institutions because of the organisational history or operational needs.
Institutes are graduate schools that conduct research projects aside of the course plan, usually in collaboration with the municipality government or national institutes (otherwise graduate schools are affiliated to schools and departments themselves).
In addition, there are supporting entities for teaching and research, including six teaching and research offices for compulsory subjects,
the University Press, and the University Library.

As of 2013, there are about 50 departments, schools and other institutions running the four disciplines of the university. The major academic units are:

 School of English Language, Literature and Culture
 School of Japanese Language, Literature and Culture
 School of Arabic Language, Literature and Culture
 School of Western European Languages
 School of Central European Languages
 School of Oriental Languages
 School of Interpreting and Translation
 Russian Department
 School of Tourism Management
 School of Hospitality Management
 School of Economics, Trade and Event Management
 School of Arts and Humanities
 School of Chinese
 School of Marxism
 School of English Education
 International School of Business
 International School of Law
 School of International Communication
 Institute of International Relations
 School of Non-common Languages
 School of Continuing Education
 School of General Education

Organisations

Institute of Tourism Development
Founded in 1984, the Research Institute of Tourism Development is one of the oldest and foremost intelligence units in the field of tourism development planning in China.

Equipped with its three research affiliates, i.e. Center for Strategic Planning, Center for Theoretical Research and Center for Industry Consulting, the Institute cooperates extensively with the National Tourism Administration, local authorities and key industry players, contributing to around 20 provincial and municipal industry development projects including those of the renowned tourism cities of Sanya, Haikou and Zhangjiagang, in addition to more than 50 executive and feasibility reports on national resorts districts, national nature reserve areas and ecotourism destinations, such as the Lake Tai Resort in Suzhou, the Changbai Mountains Natural Reserve in Jilin, and the Pagsum Lake Ecotourism Area in Tibet.

In 1998, the institute became part of the National Database for Tourism Management; since 1999, authorized by the Education Ministry, it starts to provide postgraduate coursework and research programs for Tourism Management, with research directions on theory-based strategic study of the operational mechanisms and policy-making within tourism sectors, and on practice-led tourism planning and development projects, integrating theories from business management, science, sociology and architecture.
The institute maintains strong links with China Tourism Academy and leading enterprises within the industry.

Institute for Transcultural Studies
The Institute for Transcultural Studies (ITS) is a specialized research institution for arts and humanities. Initially founded as Institute for Comparative Literature and Transcultural Studies in 2001, the Institute aims to increase intercultural understanding and to promote global presence of Chinese culture by studying classic and contemporary works on philosophy, art and literature from a cross-cultural scope.

The ITS cooperates extensively with institutions at the forefront of the domestic academia. The National Center for Foreign Literature Studies was co-founded by the Foreign Literature Institute of Chinese Academy of Social Sciences (CASS), and the Center for Aesthetics and Art Education is a cooperation program with the Chinese Aesthetics Society. Other notable ITS research branches include Center for Aesthetics and Philosophy, Center for Comparative Literature and Poetics and Center for Sino-Greco Cultural Studies, all of which enjoy sound relationships with universities and research institutions overseas.

Institutes of Linguistics and Applied Linguistics
(Chinese and foreign languages)

Research profiles

Tourism studies

BISU's academic leadership in tourism studies can be traced back to the early 1980s,
when the Chinese Tourism Ministry took charge of the university and supported the development of its tourism majors, making it the pioneer in the field of tourism education in China.
The university initiated the Cross-Strait Tourism Seminar in 2008,
and has been hosting the China Tourism Development, Beijing Dialogue Forum annually since 2004,
with strong support from the Beijing Tourism Administration.

In 2004, the Research Center for Beijing Tourism Development was established at BISU, funded by the Tourism Administration, the Education Commission and the Planning Office of Philosophy and Social Science (BJPOPSS) of the Beijing government.
The center is one of the first BJPOPSS-accredited research institutions and is positioned as the government's think tank, which facilitated the city's tourism planning and development during the Beijing 2008 Summer Olympics.
As of 2008, the center has established tourism-themed databases including
the information integration platform for China tourism industry,
the language material portal for Beijing-based professional tour guides,
observatories and databases for tourism impacts and sustainability analysis, etc.
In addition, during the period from 2005 to 2012, the Center accomplished around 70 research projects of significance, including the Annual Report of Beijing Tourism Development, the China Tourism Studies and the International Tourism Studies.

In collaboration with the China Tourism Academy, the research arm of the National Tourism Administration,
the China Hospitality Industry Research Center was founded in 2009, being referred to as a research institution "of key industries which ha[s] been selected from the over 1000 academies of tourism all over China".
According to the International Journal of Hospitality Management, during the period from 1978 to 2008, BISU is among the top 3 contributors to the academic research on Chinese tourism and hospitality management, and the Research Center Director Professor Gu Huimin is one of the top 8 intensely contributing authors worldwide.

Cultural studies

The National Institute of Cultural Development is China's first state-level culture industry institute, co-established by the Chinese Culture Ministry and BISU in 2010.
The Institute grew out of BISU's Research Center of International Trade in Services and International Cultural Trade, which was founded in 2006,
aiming to promote Chinese culture from an economic and trade perspective, and to facilitate the cultural reform of the nation.
It remains engaged in academic collaboration at both the domestic and international levels,
and has developed into both a research platform for international cultural trade and an educational base for training specialized personnel.
In 2013, as the only academic forum of its kind in China,
the Annual Forum for International Trade in Services (Beijing), which has been co-hosted by BISU and the China Association of International Trade (CAIT) since 2007,
became part of the MOFCOM-hosted 2nd China International Fair for Trade in Service.

In 2012, the Global Media and Cultural Soft Power Laboratory was jointly established by the Chinese Academy of Social Sciences and Beijing International Studies University.
It is a research and consulting institution primarily specialized in studies on mass media and cross-platform convergence, and cultural diplomacy development.
Focusing on policies and practices associated with soft power,
the Laboratory looks into issues of cultural trends and phenomena, media flows, and consumption behaviours on media products—especially in terms of film and television industries—with analytical precision.
The Laboratory is currently the only academic organisation on soft power development in China,
and is supported by CCTV and the China Publishing Group.

Center for Literary Theory and Criticism

Center for International Journalism and Media Studies

International studies

In 2012, the MOE Project of Arab Research Center was inaugurated at BISU.
It is one of the three university-based Arab studies institutions selected into the MOE Project of International Studies Research Institutes in China.
It is to conduct comprehensive studies on the Arab world, reaching out into topics including politics, economics, culture, arts, history, social conditions, religion and humanities;
the research force of the center is primarily drawn from research fellows and academic staff of the Department of Arabic Studies,
joint by multidisciplinary professionals
and the Distinguished Experts,
Li Shaoxian, VP of the top-ranked Asian think tank China Institutes of Contemporary International Relations,
and Liu Zhentang, former Chinese Ambassador to the Middle East.
According to the university president, Zhou Lie, the center is positioned to be both the think tank and the intelligence unit in the fields of academics, personnel development, decision-making consulting and international communication.

In the same year of 2012, the Center for Global Public Opinion and Audience Research
was established. It is an academic alliance between BISU and the China Foreign Languages Publishing Administration. Based on comparative research of national/regional profiles, the Center mainly focuses on opinion tracking, public diplomacy studies and the development of international cultural communication.

Institute of International Relations

Language studies 
Although BISU's School of Interpreting and Translation is relatively young (the first students of which commenced in 2007), it is now one of the only four Chinese universities recognized by the international translation studies academy CIUTI. As of 2011, 16 professors and academic staff of BISU have received the Lifetime Achievement Award in Translation bestowed by the Translators Association of China (TAC).

In 2011, the Institute of China Translation Development was set up in BISU.
Cooperating with TAC, the institute is the first national research center focused on the translation industry in China.
Its expertise lies mainly in theory development and professional practice of translation and interpreting.
In 2012, it released the first ever Annual Report on China’s Language Services Industry at the National Conference on Translation, which was regarded as remarkable contribution to the industry. It also seeks collaboration with the industry and international organisations, and is supported by CIUTI and the China Foreign Languages Publishing Administration.

In 2013, to strengthen the partnership a step further, the Training Center for China Translation Industry, another TAC-affiliated organisation was also established at BISU.

Global partnerships 

To share teaching and research experience and to facilitate student exchanges, the university maintains links with universities and academic institutions on all continents. , the university has cooperations with more than 130 global partners. It is also one of the 20 Chinese universities selected to the UNESCO China-Africa collaborative initiative.

Inbound study 

Beijing International Studies University is renowned for its international students education across the country, both in terms of student capacity and teaching quality. In 2002 and 2004, with over 8,000 long-term and 2,000 short-term international students from more than 70 countries studying at the university, BISU was named twice Outstanding Academic Institution for International Students Education by the Education Commission of the government.
For the academic year 2013–2014, BISU is one of the only two Beijing-based universities (altogether eight across the nation) entrusted by China Scholarship Council to provide foundation programs to international undergraduate students.

As a higher education institution entitled to admit Chinese Government Scholarship students, BISU provides a wide range of degree programs for students from all over the world, including 20 undergraduate programs and 11 postgraduate programs, all open to Chinese Government Scholarship applications. In addition to the government incentives, the university has established its own merit-based International Scholarships and all the overseas students at BISU are equally entitled to apply.

Confucius Institutes

Student life

Event highlights
 First-Year Welcome Party – Each year, the BISU Union has set time aside to run a welcome party for all new students. It is normally scheduled on the first Sunday evening prior to classes, after the jun xun has finished. Notable societies will put on some performance at the party, including stage play, dubbing, dancing and singing, integrating "first year must-know" elements into their shows.
 German Week – A week-long festival celebrating BISU in the autumn/winter, usually referred to as the Cultural Week of German Speaking Countries. It is hosted by the Student Union of Department of German Studies and entails a variety of events, including an opening ceremony, an annually held inter-university German speech contest, the highlight event MoreFun Wednesday Night Show, a tour of photographic exhibitions, a film night, a themed costume ball and a closing party. It is an interactive display of the diverse culture of German speaking countries including Germany, Austria, Schwizerland, Belgium, Luxembourg and Liechtenstein. Ambassadors from these countries will join the line-up of the opening ceremony, where typical German-style snacks and beverages are served free of charge and a series of micro fairs are held on topics including tourists attractions, sports, education, politics, literature, media, etc.
 Forums – An umbrella term for all the ongoing and long-term communication initiatives hosted by varied academic units of BISU. It currently comprises the Youth Elites Forum, the Boya Forum and the Career Forum, inviting personalities from the media, the political arena and literary and art circles to interact with students. Notable guests include Li Zhaoxing, Zhang Qiyue, Jin Guihua; Wang Meng, Liang Xiaosheng, Yuan Tengfei, Ji Lianhai, Rao Xueman; Joël Bellassen, Lu Jiande; Sa Beining, Han Qiaosheng, Zhang Shaogang, Chun Ni; Wang Gengnian, Sun Yusheng.
 French and Italian Week hosted by the Department of French and Italian Studies.
 Christmas and New Year's Eve Party Night hosted by the SCA BISU.
 Kohaku Uta Gassen hosted by the School of Japanese Language.
 Sing Competition hosted by the BISU Union.
 All that music Live Concert hosted by RAY Music.
 Chinese Debating Competition.

Media
XiangYu News is the university's student-run news agency. It is supported and supervised by the University Relations, incorporating the major media:
 BISU Television, usually abbreviated as BSTV, the student-run television station at BISU. The biggest project for BSTV each year is to make graduation video that is played during the graduation ceremony. 
 Voice of Erwai (VOE, or in ), the BISU radio station
 BISU Press Corps, BISU's student-journalists association, responsible for the university publication BISU Newspaper and the online news delivery at BMC, the BISU Media Center.

Self-Governance

Across the university, there are two major student-led governing bodies: Beijing International Studies University Student Union, usually known as the BISU Union, which is the official representative body of the university students, and the China Youth League BISU (CCYL BISU), which is a student council running on the party pattern. In addition, Students' Community Association BISU (SCA BISU) is another student organisation at the university level, which is in charge of the management of clubs and societies of the university.

All of the three student groups organise inter-university events, ranging from culture festivals and sports races, flea markets and party shows, to career fairs and academic seminars, or volunteering activities and leadership programs, aiming to promote social interactions and community involvement of the students, and to engage both domestic and international students to join and enjoy the BISU family.

Clubs and societies
Most of the student societies at the university are associated under SCA BISU, initiated by individuals of same interests and hobbies. Application for setting up new societies is open to University students at the beginning of each semester.

Most overseas students find societies for the particular language and culture from where they come from. There are groups for Chinese culture appreciation that are open to all. Academic and profession-oriented societies is another facet of the student clubs, such as the Business Negotiation Club and the International investment & Management Association (IIMA). Besides, in recent years, organisations on leadership development and community engagement has shown phenomenal growth at BISU, especially the AIESEC, the Association for Green Environments and the Warm Hope Volunteering.

There are high-standard university wide sports teams, most notably the flag football team The Bombers, who has had significant performances in the national leagues. Attention is also given to The Soccer BISU and The Basketball BISU, whose half-yearly competitions attracted thousands of audience to the field. Badminton, tennis and ping-pong tournaments are held annually on campus. Besides, there are interest groups for outdoor activities such as running (The Runner), martial arts (The BAMA) and roller skating (S-Power).

In 2009, the Beijing International Studies University Students Art Troupe was established, supervised under CCYL BISU. It acts as the bridge of Chinese performing arts between BISU students, other national universities and the public. The Art Troupe features a wide range of forms of performing arts, comprising the Choir, the Dance Group, the Orchestra and Percussion Group and the Drama and Recitation Group.
 Besides, there exist arts societies, which operate independently to the Students Art Troupe, which are among the most popular interest groups at BISU, including The Charming Voice (voice acting), The Compass (stage play), The PLUF Crew (dancing) and The RAY Music.

Other notable societies include The Mystery Society, The September (computer), The SSS (bicycle touring), The BISU Photographic Society, The Modelin (fashion catwalk) and The Minor (anime, comics and cosplay).

People

 Chang Zhenming – Chairman of CITIC Group, chairman and Managing Director of CITIC Pacific
 Du Jiang – Vice chairman of China National Tourism Administration
 Gao Hucheng – Minister of Commerce of PRC
 He Guangbei – Vice chairman and chief executive officer of BOC Hong Kong Holdings and Bank of China (Hong Kong)
 Liu Hongyu – Women's 20-Kilometre Race-Walk Champion of the 1999 IAAF World Championships
 Wang Yi – Minister of Foreign Affairs of PRC
 Wu Sike – China's Special Envoy on the Middle East Issue; former Chinese Ambassador to Saudi Arabia and Egypt
 Yuan Yanping – Judo gold medalist of the 2008 and 2012 Summer Paralympics (Women's +70 kg)
 Zhang Jilong – Executive President of Asian Football Federation
 Zhang Yuning (footballer, born 1977) – international soccer player

See also 
 Beijing Hospitality Institute
 Tourism Education Press
 Donghua International Travel Agency
 Affiliated High School

References

Bibliography

Notes

Footnotes

External links 

 More on BISU
 Official websites in English and Chinese
 International office in English and Chinese
 Photo gallery:    

Affiliated institutions
 National Institute of Cultural Development
 China Hospitality Industry Research Center
 Research Center for Beijing Tourism Development
 Institute of China Translation Development

Related organisations
 Institut Confucius Clermont-Ferrand
 UCLan Confucius Institute

 
Universities and colleges in Beijing
Schools in Chaoyang District, Beijing
Educational institutions established in 1964
Academic language institutions
Language education in China
1964 establishments in China